Elizabeth Freeman (1742–1829) was an African-American woman who gained freedom in Massachusetts

Elizabeth Freeman may also refer to:
Elisabeth Freeman (1876–1942), suffragist and civil rights activist
Betty Freeman (1921–2009), American photographer and philanthropist
Beth Labson Freeman (born 1953), American judge
Elise Freeman, a fictional character from Wrong Side of Town

See also
 Mary and Eliza Freeman Houses
 Lisa Freeman Roberts